Sarah Shaw may refer to:
Sarah Blake Sturgis Shaw (1815–1902), American campaigner
Sarah-Ann Shaw, American TV reporter